The 68th Wales Rally GB is the tenth round of the 2012 World Rally Championship season and is held between 14 and 16 September 2012.

The rally is also the sixth round of the Super 2000 World Rally Championship.

Results

Event standings

Special Stages

Power stage
The Power stage was a 15.33 km stage run through The Walters Arena. The three fastest crews through this stage were awarded by drivers' championship points. Mikko Hirvonen was the fastest driver through the stage, earning three additional championship points. Sébastien Loeb was second, while Ford driver Jari-Matti Latvala finished third.

References 

2012 Wales Rally GB ewrc-results.com

External links 
 

Wales
Rally GB
Wales Rally